This article provides details of international football games played by the Greece national football team from their inception in 1929 to 1959.

The Greece national team was officially created in 1929, however, the first appearance of a Greece national team came 33 years earlier, at the 1896 Summer Olympics in Athens, where a Greece XI was beaten by a Denmark XI, either 0–9 or 0–15, at the Neo Phaliron Velodrome in a demonstration game. Greece also participated in the 1906 Intercalated Games in Athens, as the Athens City selection, which ended in another humiliation at the hands of the Danish, losing the final 0–9. Greece also participated in the Inter-Allied Games in Paris in 1919, and in the 1920 Summer Olympics of Antwerp (recognized as first official by FIFA).

Between their first official match in 1929 and 1959, Greece played in 70 matches, resulting in 17 victories, 10 draws and 43 defeats. Throughout this period they played in the Balkan Cup six times between 1929 and 1936 with their best result being a second-place in the 1934–35 edition. Greece also participated in three Mediterranean Cups in 1949, 1950-53 and 1953-58, with Greece never doing better than a second-place finish in the second edition.

Results

1896 Olympic Games

1906 Intercalated Games

1919 Inter-Allied Games

1920 Summer Olympics

Greece national football team

1929

1930

1931

1932

1933

1934

1935

1936

1938

1948

1949

1950

1951

1952

1953

1954

1955

1956

1957

1958

1959

Head to head records

References 

Football in Greece
Greece national football team results